Kilgore is an unincorporated community on Antelope Valley Road in Clark County, Idaho, United States. Kilgore is situated next to the East Camas Creek.

It is the nearest community to Camas Meadows Battle Sites, a National Historic Landmark.

History
Kilgore's population was 85 in 1909, and was 20 in 1960.

References

Unincorporated communities in Clark County, Idaho
Unincorporated communities in Idaho